Kosecki and its feminine form Kosecka are Slavic surnames. Notable people with the surname include:

 Jakub Kosecki (born 1990), Polish footballer
 Jana Košecká, Slovak-American computer scientist
 Roman Kosecki (born 1966), Polish footballer

Slavic-language surnames